Schuh is a surname. Notable people with the name include:

 Anneliese Schuh-Proxauf (1922–2020), Austrian former alpine skier who competed in the 1948 Winter Olympics
 Audrey Schuh (born 1931), American operatic soprano
 Bérengère Schuh (born 1984), French athlete 
 Christopher Schuh (born 1975), American metallurgist
 Dieter Schuh (born 1942), German Tibetologist, entrepreneur and politician
 Franz Schuh (disambiguation), several people
 Frederik Schuh (1875–1966), Dutch mathematician
 Gotthard Schuh (1897–1969), Swiss photographer and painter 
 Harry Schuh (1942–2013), American football player
 Jakob Schuh (born 1976), German animator
 Jeff Schuh (born 1958), American football player
 Klement Schuh (1916–1995), Austrian weightlifter.
 Marc Schuh (born 1989), German wheelchair sprinter
 Melina Schuh, German molecular biologist.
 Oscar Fritz Schuh (1904–1984), German-Austrian opera director, theatre director and opera manager
 Richard Schuh (1920–1949), German convicted murderer
 Russell Schuh (1941–2016), American linguist
 Steve Schuh (born 1960), American county executive of Anne Arundel County, Maryland
 Willi Schuh (1900–1986), Swiss musicologist

See also
Shue, surname